Percy Janes (March 12, 1922 – February 19, 1999) was a Canadian writer and novelist, known primarily for his novel House of Hate.  His work often deals with life in Newfoundland, mainly from his own first hand experience.

Biography

Early life
He was born in St. John's, Newfoundland on March 12, 1922, the son of Eli Janes and Lillian Berkshire.  The family moved to Corner Brook, Newfoundland when he was seven years old.  There he attended school until 1938, when he received a scholarship to attend Memorial University College in St. John's.  He started his writing career in 1940 as editor for the college's yearbook. While attending the Memorial University College and after his discharge from the navy he wrote poems, and by the late 1950s had written his first book, So Young and Beautiful. While still attending high school, he briefly spent time in the Canadian Navy when he moved to Canada after graduating from Memorial University College.  He was enrolled at the Victoria College of University of Toronto, where he graduated with a Bachelor of Arts degree in 1948, winning the Lincoln Hutton Scholarship in 1946. In 1951, became a full-time writer. His first novel, So Young and Beautiful, was published by H. Stockwell.

House of Hate
While Janes was in England, he began writing his most popular and critically acclaimed book, House of Hate.  The novel was a story of a Newfoundland family that was consumed by hate, living in angst and desperately searching for hope and love.  This novel had taken several years to write and numerous failed attempts at getting published before Toronto publisher McClelland and Stewart published it in 1970.

Personal life
Janes married Margaret Matthews of Ontario in 1950. They divorced in 1954, with no children. He did not remarry.

The Newfoundland and Labrador Arts Council presents an annual literary award, the Percy Janes First Novel Award, in his memory.

Notable works

Novels
So Young and Beautiful, 1958.
House of Hate, 1970.
Eastmall, 1982.
No Cage for Conquerors, 1984.
Requiem for a Faith (Volume 1 & 2), 1984.
The Picture on the Wall, 1975.

Short stories
"Newfoundlanders", 1981.
A Collection of Short Stories, 1986.

Poems and anthologies
Light and Dark, 1980.
Roots of Evil, 1985.

References

External links
  House of Hate preview at  Google Books.

1922 births
1999 deaths
Canadian male novelists
Writers from St. John's, Newfoundland and Labrador
20th-century Canadian novelists
20th-century Canadian male writers